Jack McCarthy may refer to:

Jack McCarthy (Australian footballer) (1884–1939), Australian rules footballer
Jack McCarthy (baseball) (1869–1948), Major League Baseball outfielder
Jack McCarthy (cricketer) (1917-1998), Australian cricketer
Jack McCarthy (Irish footballer) (c. 1898–?), Irish soccer player during the 1920s and 1930s
Jack McCarthy (television) (1914–1996), WPIX program host

See also
John McCarthy (disambiguation)